The Sabatini Gardens (in Spanish: Jardines de Sabatini) are part of the Royal Palace in Madrid, Spain, and were opened to the public by King Juan Carlos I in 1978. They honor the name of Francesco Sabatini (1722–1797), an Italian architect of the 18th century who designed, among other works at the palace, the royal stables of the palace, previously located at this site.

In 1933, clearing of the stable buildings was begun, and construction of the gardens begun, which were only completed in the late 1970s. The gardens have a formal Neoclassic style, consisting of well-sheared hedges, in symmetric geometrical patterns, adorned with a pool, statues and fountains, with trees also disposed in a symmetrical geometric shape. The statues are those of Spanish kings, not intended originally to even grace a garden, but originally crowding the adjacent palace. The tranquil array is a peaceful corner from which to view the palace.

The gardens are divided into three terraces. The first one has a great symmetry in its design and whose center is a sheet of water that has the function of a mirror. The second terrace is located on the first one, where you can see the entire facade of the Royal Palace from where there is a pine grove to the Cuesta de San Vicente, a street that has an entrance with steps to the Sabatini Gardens. To the east of this second terrace is the third one.

References

External links

 Picture of Sabatini Gardens
 The Quirky History of the Sabatini Gardens — illustrated article

Gardens in Spain
Parks in Madrid
Palacio neighborhood, Madrid